Vincent Roland Chesterfield Bridgewater (died February 2015) was a Bermudian dentist and member of the parliament of Bermuda for the United Bermuda Party from the constituency of Paget West.

References

United Bermuda Party politicians
Year of birth missing
Members of the Parliament of Bermuda
Bermudian dentists
2015 deaths